Anne Hill is the most prominent hill on Radian Ridge in the Royal Society Range of Victoria Land. It was named after Anne C. Wright (later Anne Wright-Grassham), a geologist with, firstly, the New Zealand Geological Survey field party in this area, 1977–78, then with United States Antarctic Research Program field parties, 1982–83, 1983–84, and 1985–86 seasons, with work at Ross Island, Minna Bluff, Mount Discovery, Mount Morning, and Mason Spur.

References
 

Hills of Victoria Land
Scott Coast